Krahe is a surname. Notable people with the surname include:

 Fred Krahe (1919–1981), Australian police officer and detective
 Hans Krahe (1898–1965), German philologist and linguist
 Lambert Krahe (1712-1790), German painter
 Peter Joseph Krahe (1758-1840), German architect

See also 
 Raab Krähe, motorglider
 VA-18 Primitiv Krähe, motorglider
 Krahës, an Albanian village and former municipality

de:Krahe
German-language surnames